Remotti is an Italian surname. Notable people with the surname include:

Francesco Remotti (born 1943), Italian anthropologist
Remo Remotti (1924–2015), Italian actor, playwright, artist and poet

Italian-language surnames